The 1997 Rugby League Divisional Premiership  was the 11th and final end of season Rugby League Divisional Premiership competition and the second in the Super League era. Following this season, the competition was replaced by a play-off system which would be used to decide the second Division championship and promotion to the Super League.

The competition was completely restructured for the 1997 season. With the exception of the bottom two Division Two clubs, Doncaster Dragons and Prescot Panthers, it was expanded to include all Division One and Division Two clubs. A group stage was added, which consisted of four pools of five teams based on region, although some team were assigned to another pool to keep the group sizes even (Yorkshire-based Keighley Cougars were placed in the Lancashire pool, and Lancashire Lynx competed in the Cumbrian group). The top two teams in each group then progressed to the knockout stage of the competition.

The winners were Huddersfield Giants.

Regional pools

Cumbria

Lancashire

East Yorkshire

West Yorkshire

Quarter-finals

Semi-finals

Final

See also
 1997 RFL Division One
 1997 RFL Division Two

Notes

References
  

Rugby League Divisional Premiership